The Turkish ambassador to China is the chief Turkish diplomat to People's Republic of China (PRC).

List of Turkish chiefs of mission to China

Envoys to the Republic of China

Ambassadors to the Republic of China

Ambassadors to the People's Republic of China

See also 

 China–Turkey relations
 Foreign relations of China

References

External links 

 Turkish Embassy in Beijing

China
Turkey